Arlington Township is an inactive township in Phelps County, in the U.S. state of Missouri.

Arlington Township was erected in 1857, its name from the community of Arlington, Missouri.

References

Townships in Missouri
Townships in Phelps County, Missouri
1857 establishments in Missouri